The Broadway was a British 4 wheeled cyclecar made only in 1913 by the Broadway Cyclecar Co of Coventry.

The car was powered by an air-cooled, V twin, engine made by Fafnir driving the rear wheels by a two speed gearbox and belts. It cost GBP80.

See also
 List of car manufacturers of the United Kingdom

References 

Defunct motor vehicle manufacturers of England
Cyclecars
Coventry motor companies
Vehicle manufacturing companies established in 1913
1913 establishments in England